VfR Mannheim is a German association football club based in Mannheim, Baden-Württemberg formed in 1911 out of the fusion of Mannheimer FG 1896, Mannheimer FG 1897 Union, and FC Viktoria 1897 Mannheim. The club captured the national title in 1949 with a victory over Borussia Dortmund. They have played through most of its recent history as an unheralded local amateur side and were, until 2015, part of the Oberliga Baden-Württemberg (V).

History
Predecessor sides FG Mannheim, Mannheimer FG Union and Viktoria Mannheim were each founding members of the German Football Association in 1900. These various Mannheim teams were members of the VSFV (Verband Süddeutscher Fussball Vereine or Federation of South German Football Clubs) and after their merger in 1911 played as VfR through the 1910s and 1920s in the Westkreis-Liga. The club emerged as the league champions of the Kreisliga Odenwald in 1922 and the Bezirksliga Rhein in 1925. They took part in the national playoffs after their Bezirksliga title and subsequent regional Süddeutschland win, but went out in an eighth final to TuRu Düsseldorf. The club finished in mid-table throughout the late 1920s and early 1930s in the Bezirksliga Rhein-Saar.

Success through the 1930s and 1940s
After the 1933 re-organization of German football under the Third Reich into sixteen top flight regional leagues, Mannheim began play in the Gauliga Baden. The club performed well in the years leading up to World War II and the throughout the conflict, taking division titles in 1935, 1938, 1939, 1943 and 1944. However they could not translate this success in league play into success in the national playoffs with their best result being an advance to the 1943 quarterfinals where they were put out 2–3 by eventual vice-champions FV Saarbrücken.

Mannheim repeated as division champions in 1944. Wartime conditions made playing football increasingly difficult in the country, so much so that the national playoffs were initially abandoned and VfR declared champions by the sport's governing authority. However, this decision was revoked after protests from other clubs and the playoff competition reinstated. Mannheim advanced only as far as the eighth final before being eliminated by 1. FC Nürnberg.

Postwar national championship

After the war VfR Mannheim played in the first division Oberliga Süd where they earned unremarkable results until a surprising breakthrough in 1949 that saw the team transform a distant second-place finish in their division into a national championship. After thrashing Hamburger SV 5–0 in the opening round, they upset Kickers Offenbach, who had finished eleven points ahead of them in their Oberliga division that season, by a score of 2–1. VfR then earned a come from behind 3–2 overtime victory over Borussia Dortmund in front of 90,000 fans in the final. Between 1903 and 1944 German national champions were awarded the Viktoria trophy. The 1944 final between Dresdner SC and Luftwaffen-SV Hamburg was the last Viktoria match ever played as the trophy disappeared at war's end. The missing prize was replaced by the Meisterschale in 1949 and was first awarded to Mannheim despite 1. FC Nürnberg being Germany's first postwar champions in 1948. Today the Meisterschale recognizes the country's Bundesliga champions and is inscribed with the names of each national championship team since 1903. The Viktoria has since been recovered and is held by the German Football Association.

The next year they again met Dortmund in the playoffs, this time in the opening round, and once again eliminated them. However, they would themselves be put out in the next round by Preußen Dellbrück and begin a slide into anonymity.

Descent from the top flight
Mannheim played in the second tier Regionalliga Süd formed in 1963 at the same time as Germany's new professional league, the Bundesliga. After ten years near or at the bottom of the league table they fell to tier III football, the Amateurliga Nordbaden. Despite ongoing financial problems they rebuffed offers of a merger from SV Waldhof Mannheim in 1998 and again in 2003. They were denied a license that year and driven to the Verbandsliga Nordbaden (V). However, the side performed well enough to win their division the next season and promotion to Oberliga Baden-Württemberg (IV), where they play today. With a sixteenth place in 2007–08, they narrowly avoided relegation, being on equal points with the seventeenth team.

After suffering relegation in 2009, the club took two seasons to recover before returning to the Oberliga in 2011. In its first season back the club finished second in the league behind SSV Ulm 1846. In the 2014–15 season the club came second-last in the league and was relegated to the Verbandsliga.

Honours
The club's honours:

League
 German football championship
 Champions: 1949
 Southern German championship
 Champions: 1925

Regional
 Westkreis-Liga (I)
 Champions: 1910, 1911, 1913, 1914
 Kreisliga Odenwald (I)
 Champions: 1922
 Runners-up: 1920, 1921
 Bezirksliga Rhein (I)
 Champions: 1925, 1926
 Runners-up: 1924, 1927
 Gauliga Baden (I)
 Champions: 1935, 1938, 1939, 1943, 1944
 Runners-up: 1934, 1937, 1940
 Amateurliga Nordbaden (III)
 Champions: 1973, 1976
 Verbandsliga Nordbaden (V)
 Champions: 2004
 Runners-up: 2011
 Southern German Cup
 Winners: 1959
 North Baden Cup (Tiers III-VII)
 Winners: 1972, 1997, 2001
 Runners-up: 2004

Other sports
 The club has won the German championship in baseball in 1965, 1966 and 1970.

Recent managers
Recent managers of the club:

Recent seasons
The recent season-by-season performance of the club:

 With the introduction of the Regionalligas in 1994 and the 3. Liga in 2008 as the new third tier, below the 2. Bundesliga, all leagues below dropped one tier.

References

External links
 Official website 
 Das deutsche Fußball-Archiv historical German domestic league tables 
 VfR Mannheim at Weltfussball.de

 
Football clubs in Germany
Football clubs in Baden-Württemberg
Association football clubs established in 1911
1896 establishments in Germany
Sport in Mannheim
2. Bundesliga clubs